Pellilitorina setosa is a species of sea snail, a marine gastropod mollusk in the family Littorinidae, the winkles or periwinkles. The reproduce sexually.

References

Littorinidae
Gastropods described in 1875